Evangelical Deaconess Hospital's four-story building on Chauncey Street continued to serve the Bushwick, Brooklyn neighborhood even after the hospital closed in the 1950s.

History

Twenty years after the hospital was closed, and the community rejected using it as an overflow for a Bronx-based drug rehab program, the structure was adapted into a temporary relocation facility for "welfare families now in hotels as well as families left homeless by fires."

It subsequently became a homeless men's shelter.

See also
 Deaconess Hospital (St. Louis, Missouri)

References

    

Defunct hospitals in Brooklyn